Hesse is a German surname. Notable people with the surname include:
Adolf Friedrich Hesse (1809–1863), German composer
Adukwei Hesse, Ghanaian physician-academic, tuberculosis control expert, prison reform advocate and Presbyterian minister
Afua Adwo Jectey Hesse, First Ghanaian woman to train as a paediatric surgeon
Amandine Hesse (born 1993), French tennis player
Chris Tsui Hesse (born 1932), cinematographer, filmmaker, prison reform campaigner and Presbyterian minister
Christian Heinrich Friedrich Hesse (1772-1832), German pastor and naturalist
Eva Hesse (1936–1970), painter and sculptor
Herman Chinery-Hesse (born 1963), Ghanaian technology entrepreneur and founder of the SOFTribe
Hermann Hesse (1877–1962), German-born poet, novelist, and painter, Nobel Prize in Literature 1946
Karen Hesse (born 1952), US writer
Konrad Hesse (1919–2005), German jurist
Lebrecht James Chinery-Hesse (1930–2018), Ghanaian lawyer, civil servant and diplomat
Lebrecht Wilhelm Fifi Hesse (1934–2000), First black African Rhodes Scholar
Linda Hesse (born 1987), German singer 
Lo Hesse (1889–1983?), German dancer
Lucien Hesse (1866-1929), French architect
Mary Hesse (born 1924), US philosopher
Mary Chinery-Hesse (born 1938), Ghanaian international civil servant and diplomat, first woman Chancellor of the University of Ghana
Otto Hesse (1811–1874), German mathematician, known for the Hessian matrix
Parker Hesse (born 1995), American football player
Paul Hesse (1857–1938), German malacologist
Regina Hesse (1832–1898), pioneer woman educator-administrator in colonial Ghana
Richard Hesse (1868–1944), German zoologist
Ruth Hesse (born 1936), German operatic mezzo-soprano and contralto
Stefan Heße (born 1966), German Roman Catholic bishop
Virginia Hesse (born 1944), Ghanaian civil servant and diplomat
Walther Hesse (1846–1911), German microbiologist

See also
Ernst von Hesse-Wartegg (1851–1918), Austrian travel-author
Hasse (surname) 
Hess (surname)

German-language surnames
German toponymic surnames
Ethnonymic surnames